The 1947–48 UCLA Bruins men's basketball team represented the University of California, Los Angeles during the 1947–48 NCAA men's basketball season and were members of the Pacific Coast Conference. The Bruins were led by ninth year head coach Wilbur Johns. They finished the regular season with a record of 12–13 and were third in the PCC southern division with a record of 3–9.  It was also the Bruins' final season before the legendary John Wooden took over as the head coach the next season.

Previous season

The Bruins finished the regular season with a record of 18–7 and won the PCC southern division with a record of 9–3.

Roster

Schedule

|-
!colspan=9 style=|Regular Season

Source

References

UCLA Bruins men's basketball seasons
Ucla
UCLA Bruins Basketball
UCLA Bruins Basketball